Kenosha Unified School District (KUSD) serves the city of Kenosha, the Town of Somers and the village of Pleasant Prairie. KUSD is overseen by a school board of seven elected members whose president is Dan Wade. The superintendent of KUSD is Dr. Sue Savaglio-Jarvis.

KUSD Board of Education
 Yolanda Adams - President
 Todd Battle - Vice President
 Tony Garcia - Clerk
 Mary Modder - Treasurer
 Dr. Todd Alan Price
 Atifa Robinson
 Rebecca Stevens

Mission statement
The Kenosha Unified School District's mission is to "provide excellent, challenging learning opportunities and experiences that prepare each student for success."

Schools
KUSD encompasses 23 elementary schools, five middle schools, five high schools, and five charter schools, although Kenosha School of Technology Enhanced Curriculum has two campuses: East and West.  In addition to these, Hillcrest School provides an alternative for expelled middle and high school students who need to address behavioral, as well as academic changes.

Elementary
Bose Elementary
Brass Community School
Cesar E. Chavez Learning Station
Curtis A. Strange Elementary
Edward Bain School of Language and Art
Forest Park Elementary
Frank Elementary
Grant Elementary
Grewenow Elementary
Harvey Elementary
Jefferson Elementary
Jeffery Elementary
McKinley Elementary
Nash Elementary
Pleasant Prairie Elementary
Prairie Lane Elementary
Roosevelt Elementary
Somers Elementary
Southport Elementary
Stocker Elementary
Vernon Elementary
Whittier Elementary
Wilson Elementary

Middle
Bullen Middle School
Lance Middle School
Lincoln Middle School
Mahone Middle School
Washington Middle School

High schools
Mary D. Bradford High School
Indian Trail High School and Academy
LakeView Technology Academy
Reuther Central High School
George Nelson Tremper High School

Charter schools
Brompton School (Grades K-8)
Dimensions of Learning Academy (Grades K-8)
Harborside Academy (Grades 6-12)
Kenosha eSchool (Grades K-12)
Kenosha School of Technology Enhanced Curriculum (Grades K-8)

Music
The Kenosha public school orchestra program starts at the fifth-grade level and continues into high school. The concert and symphony orchestras of the city's high schools present fall and spring concerts. In addition, the Tremper High School Golden Strings ensemble has performed throughout the United States and internationally since the early 1970s.

The Orchestra Festival has been a part of Kenosha history since 1963. Typically held in March each year, it showcases student performances at every level. Each year a guest conductor works with all of the ensembles, and awards are presented for music camps, teacher service and financial support, among other achievements.

The Band-O-Rama is a citywide school concert held annually since the mid-1950s, featuring the Kenosha Unified School District's band program, totaling about 1,700 students in grades 5 through 12. As with the Orchestra Festival, the Band-O-Rama features a guest conductor.  The show typically begins with an opening fanfare, followed by the National Anthem, after which each grade level is showcased one by one with several selections. At the finale, the massed bands play Sousa's "Stars and Stripes Forever".

Controversies
In 2018, the Kenosha Unified School District settled a lawsuit for $800,000 that had been filed by a transgender male student who had been banned from the boys' restroom. The school district had previously lost in the Seventh U.S. Circuit Court of Appeals.

Schools in the area have been criticized by the American Civil Liberties Union for applying a sexist dress code. Girls have been sent home for wearing tank tops, leggings and yoga pants while sweatpants and basketball shorts for boys were permitted.

References

External links
Kenosha Unified School District

School districts in Wisconsin
Education in Kenosha, Wisconsin